Storm was a Norwegian viking metal band that originally included Fenriz of Darkthrone and Satyr of Satyricon. Later on, Kari Rueslåtten, formerly of the band The 3rd and the Mortal, also joined them on vocals. The project only released one album, titled Nordavind, released in 1995, which makes them among the first viking and folk metal bands.

History

Split 
After the recording of the one and only album, Kari Rueslåtten stated in the Norwegian music newspaper Puls that she would join the band if there were no extreme lyrics in the songs. But then she felt betrayed by Satyr and Fenriz, because Satyr wrote a new end to the song "Oppi fjellet," which contained strongly anti-Christian lyrics. According to Kari:

As a reaction to Rueslåtten's publicly aired regrets over her involvement with Storm, Satyr stated in an interview:

Kari Rueslåtten has gone on to have a solo career and Satyr and Fenriz have pursued their other musical projects.

Band members 
 Herr Nagell – drums, vocals
 Kari Rueslåtten – vocals
 Sigurd Wongraven – guitars, bass, synthesizer, vocals

Discography 
 Nordavind (1995)

References 

Norwegian folk metal musical groups
Musical groups established in 1993
Norwegian musical trios
1993 establishments in Norway
Musical groups disestablished in 1995
1995 disestablishments in Norway
Musical groups from Oslo